"The Seance Spectre" is the twentieth episode of the second series of Space: 1999 (and the forty-fourth overall episode of the programme). The screenplay was written by Donald James; the director was Peter Medak.  The original title was "The Mutiny". The final shooting script is dated 16 September 1976. Live-action filming took place Monday 18 October 1976 through Saturday 30 October 1976.

Story 
It is 2012 days after leaving Earth orbit, and Moonbase Alpha is operating under strict security protocols. Three weeks ago, a celestial body was sighted and given the code-name 'Tora'. Long-range analysis proved inconclusive, but within twenty-four hours the Moon will be in range to determine whether it is a habitable planet. Not wanting to raise false hope, John Koenig has ordered all knowledge of Tora classified. Command Centre is off-limits to all but senior executives and access to the information  channels by the general population has been restricted.

In the Recreation Centre, Greg Sanderson is ranting about the restrictions. Once Alpha's finest surface-exploration team leader, he has degenerated into a loud-mouthed malcontent. Controlling his team (Cernik, Stevens and girlfriend Eva) with a Svengali-like charisma, he presents his latest conspiracy theory—how the Alpha elite are hiding the fact the Moon is approaching a habitable planet. Marching on Command Centre, Sanderson breaks in and stuns the executive staff. As he views Tora, he declares the irregular mass of dust and gas to be a planet. Another 'astro-prediction' will be required to determine its habitability. Locking the door, the four join hands in a séance-like ring and concentrate.

Koenig and Alan Carter are flying reconnaissance. Observations show that the Tora formation is shifting position—the mutual attraction between it and the Moon has locked them on a collision course. When Koenig tries to radio in the forecast, there is no response. The four mutineers have slipped into a hypnotic trance and Sanderson's prophesies of a habitable planet drown out the Commander's warning.

Returning to base, Koenig retakes Command Centre and confines Sanderson and company to Medical. Helena Russell reports the trance was the result of autohypnosis. The underlying cause of their behaviour is 'greensickness': a mental condition in which subconscious tensions are generated by a prolonged existence in an artificial environment. In extreme cases, these tensions manifest a psychological craving for contact with nature, resulting in disorientation and hallucinations. The doctor reckons the team's condition has been exacerbated by their job: month-long survey missions out on the barren lunar wasteland.

The data from Eagle Four's on-board computer shows Tora to be a mass of dust and atmospheric gasses, with electrical storm activity and various precipitations forming a freakish 'weather belt'. The Moon could pass straight through unless it contains a solid centre. With that threat, Koenig prepares a reconnaissance mission. In the Medical Centre, Sanderson rejects Helena's treatment, assaults the guards and escapes. Confronting Koenig, he insists Tora's true nature has been suppressed to prevent them settling there; as long as the Alphans remain on the wandering Moon, 'Commander Koenig's dictatorship' is safe.

Koenig is concerned that Sanderson's deluded beliefs could poison the entire community. To dispel rumours of a cover-up, the Commander agrees that the mission will be simulcast to the general population. Also, all data from Tora will be processed by Moonbase Computer. Satisfied, a smug Sanderson is escorted back to the care unit. As Koenig and Maya depart for Tora, Helena begins treating Sanderson, Cernik and Stevens. Eva is discharged as her ailment is not greensickness and quite untreatable—she is in love with Sanderson. Her misguided loyalty leads her to turn in a false medical-emergency call. After the Medical staff leaves, she incapacitates the guards with an anaesthetic aerosol and frees Sanderson and company.

With eager anticipation, the entire base focuses the survey mission. When approaching Tora, Eagle One links up with Main Computer. At range three, the ship enters the atmosphere belt; Sandra Benes analyses the data and confirms it to be unbreathable. At range two, instruments display a kinetic reading that could either be an atmospheric vibration or a gravitational pull. Flying through an opaque haze, Koenig is increasingly concerned by the possibility of a solid central mass.

Sanderson and his cronies have hidden in a service area of the Computer Section. After Sahn's report, Sanderson protests that Earth's atmosphere is also unsuitable at its outer limits. Koenig must be forced to penetrate further; to do so, he tears several circuit-boards out of a computer processor. When the potential gravity reading appears to fall to zero, Eagle One is cleared to proceed. However, Koenig's piloting instincts tell him something is amiss; approaching range one, he can feel external forces acting on the ship, defying the claim of zero gravity.

A diagnostic of the computer system is conducted and the malfunction is discovered. Tony Verdeschi aborts the mission too late. Sanderson chuckles as the Eagle strains against intense gravitational forces, out of control. From out of the mist, a planetary mass appears. The ship crashes, half-buried in a 'swamp' of thick dust and loose rock. The Eagle is in poor shape—hull integrity compromised, voice transmission silenced, oxygen recycling plant damaged—but telemetry shows the engines and guidance system are functional.

Carter establishes a remote link and, under automatic control, blasts the ship free from the surface. However, it is a three-hour flight back to the Moon and only one hour's worth of oxygen remains. With both spacesuit helmets damaged in the crash, Koenig has an inspiration: Maya can become a source of oxygen by transforming into vegetation. When the ship lands, the emergency crew finds an unconscious Koenig surrounded by a dense thicket—which recedes as Maya ends her third one-hour stint as vegetation. To Helena's relief, Koenig quickly recovers when given oxygen.

After a medical check, Koenig surveys the vandalised computer processor, then contacts the vandal. Sanderson and his band have locked themselves in a travel-tube capsule stopped between stations. Koenig informs them that Tora is a lifeless proto-planet; they have arrived millions of years too early for the blue skies and green fields seen in their hallucinations. Sanderson balks — the latest astro-prediction has shown that not only is Tora an Earth-type world, but the Moon will be drawn into orbit around it.

With eight hours until collision, the staff brainstorms. With their limited supply of nuclear explosives, they can neither destroy Tora nor affect its trajectory. They must alter the Moon's course. Koenig suggests recreating by design the accident which started their mad journey, making the decision to detonate a nuclear-waste disposal site. Computer predicts the abrupt two-degree shift in course required would result in significant damage—and a zero survival rate. Koenig orders an immediate evacuation; if the plan fails, life will continue aboard the fleet of Eagle transporters.

Sanderson interprets Koenig's actions as a ploy to retain his command. For the sake of the  community, he and his followers remain in the travel tube—counting on the Commander's concern for their lives to prevent him detonating the waste pits. As he rants on, the others express their growing doubts: Is greensickness distorting their judgment?  If the danger is real, what will prevent Koenig from sacrificing their four lives to save the Moon? Is Sanderson any less a dictator than he claims Koenig to be? When the matter is placed to a vote, the result is three-to-one in favour of evacuation. Though taken aback by their defection, Sanderson accedes to majority rule and restarts the travel unit.

After the evacuation, Koenig and Maya remain to secure Moonbase against the explosion's effects. Just as they are warned that Sanderson never evacuated, the crazed man bursts in on them and guns down Koenig with a stun-blast; threats against Maya's safety keep the others from landing. The self-chosen messiah intends to wait out the two hours twenty-three minutes to the false 'collision'. Attempts to make him see reason—even from Eva—only serve to fuel his rage and he decides Koenig must die for his crimes against the Alphans. He is disarmed by a Maya-transformed reptilian beast, but escapes.

When Koenig recovers, he and Maya quickly seal off and depressurise Alpha, then proceed to the disposal site in Eagle Two. Older and located some distance from Disposal Areas One and Two, it was not involved in the cataclysmic explosion of 1999. Six concrete-capped shafts store atomic waste ten thousand feet below the surface. One will be blasted open, then an atomic trigger-device introduced and remote-detonated to start the chain reaction. From above, Verdeschi's Eagle Three spots a moon buggy parked amid the surrounding hills; Sanderson has driven from Alpha and is waiting for them.

The trigger's timer is set for eighteen minutes—the time left before the collision is unavoidable—and Koenig suits up and lopes across the lunar surface to the nearest waste silo.  As Sanderson watches from his hiding place, the shaft is blasted open. He targets Koenig's back with a stolen laser rifle just as he is sighted from the air. Eavesdropping on their frequency, Sanderson is warned. He turns to shoot at Eagle Two, damaging her, just as Maya fires the ship's laser. Sanderson recovers from the near-miss and runs to stop Koenig as he affixes the trigger. The two men tussle, and Koenig ends up hanging by his fingers from the rim of the open shaft. As Sanderson tries to stamp down on his hands, Koenig catches his leg and the mutineer loses his balance and plunges down into the silo.

At eight minutes before detonation, Koenig makes his way back to Eagle Two. Boarding the damaged ship, he finds the command-module hatch jammed. Trapped beneath the damaged pilot's seat, Maya cannot reach the door's manual release. With four minutes remaining, Maya transforms into a Psychon toddler, wriggles free and opens the hatch.  Lifting off, Koenig blasts away at full throttle. The final seconds tick away on the trigger and the waste area is consumed in a massive explosion. As the blast-glare dies, they observe the success of the operation as the Moon safely passes Tora.

Days later, Alpha is back to normal and the staff is spending their off-duty time in the theatre and media rooms. To avert future outbreaks of greensickness, Helena has made the viewing of many hours of nature footage mandatory; her theory is saturation with images of trees, meadows and streams will equate nature with boredom. It seems to be a success as everyone is bored stiff—with the exception of Verdeschi and Carter, who get great pleasure out of their nature watch as all their screen-shots include pin-up girls.

Cast

Starring 
 Martin Landau — Commander John Koenig
 Barbara Bain — Doctor Helena Russell

Also starring 
 Catherine Schell — Maya

Featuring 
 Tony Anholt — Tony Verdeschi
 Nick Tate — Captain Alan Carter
 Zienia Merton — Sandra Benes

Guest stars 
 Ken Hutchison — Greg Sanderson
 Carolyn Seymour — Eva

Also featuring 
 Nigel Pegram — Cernik
 James Snell — Stevens
 Christopher Asante — Command Centre Security Guard

Uncredited artists 
 Robert Reeves — Peter
 Quentin Pierre — Security Guard One (Pierce Quinton)
 Harry Fielder — Security Guard Two (George)
 Jenny Cresswell — Nurse
 Christine White and Candy Wilson — Maya/Child
 Venicia Day — Maya/Bikini Girl (removed from final cut)

Music 
The score was re-edited from previous Space: 1999 incidental music tracks composed for the second series by Derek Wadsworth and draws primarily from the scores of "The Metamorph" and "The Exiles".

Production notes 
 The episode carried the working title "The Mutiny" and had antagonist Greg Sanderson originally named 'Sandor'. A sequence showing Verdeschi and Carter coordinating the personnel and equipment evacuation from two Embarkation Areas was dropped before filming. Filmed but removed from the final cut was the end of the epilogue. After revealing that the two men are looking at pin-up girls, the viewer would have seen Maya transform into the last model to be pictured (portrayed by actress Venicia Day) and walk enticingly across the room. Verdeschi would then humorously have to stop Carter from chatting her up. Also cut for time was exposition about the waste-disposal site. Koenig would have informed Maya that these old nuclear-waste silos were designated Storage Area B-7 and had been set up in the 1980s.
 This episode would feature the final appearance of Zienia Merton. Though receiving greater exposure in her second round of episodes, her continued lack of contract and reduced salary (compared to the first series) had her agent keeping an eye out for other work. Merton was offered a lead role in the Norwegian film Kosmetikkrevolusjonen.  Even after receiving the blessings of both Gerry Anderson and Fred Freiberger to leave, she still hoped to finish out the series; however, constant rescheduling repeatedly extended the Space: 1999 production schedule. Forced to choose, she gambled that there would be no third series and made plans to leave the production for Norway. The notice from ITC cancelling the series came soon after, during the filming of this episode. She would be replaced in the final three episodes by American actress Alibe Parsons playing a new character, Alibe.
 Among the models ogled by Verdeschi and Carter, many will recognise 1970s science-fiction/fantasy genre actress and Navy Rum model Caroline Munro. Sharp-eyed viewers will also recognise actor James Snell (who portrayed Stevens) from his previous appearance as the doomed Eagle co-pilot Cousteau in the first-series episode "Space Brain".

Novelisation 
The episode was adapted in the fifth Year Two Space: 1999 novel The Time Fighters by Michael Butterworth published in 1977. Significant changes were made to the narrative as the author chose to blend this story with "Devil's Planet". Koenig is off exploring when Sandor and his many followers overrun Command Centre; Verdeschi is the commanding officer in this story as Koenig is missing and presumed dead in the crash on Entra. Sandor and his cronies are rank-and-file Alphans, not surface explorers, and their mutiny is depicted as a workers' revolt; no mention is made of greensickness or its psychology. The story ends with Verdeschi dispatching Sandor and detonating the waste pits. These alterations would be reversed by Butterworth when he reworked the story for the Powys Media omnibus publication Space: 1999—Year Two.

In the 2003 novel The Forsaken written by John Kenneth Muir, it is stated the events of this story were one of the consequences of the death of the eponymous intelligence depicted in "Space Brain".  The Brain protected the proto-planet Tora, knowing that intelligent life would eventually evolve there; after its death, the protection ceased and the Moon and Tora would almost collide.

References

External links 
Space: 1999 - "The Seance Spectre" - The Catacombs episode guide
Space: 1999 - "The Seance Spectre" - Moonbase Alpha's Space: 1999 page

1977 British television episodes
Space: 1999 episodes